Paul Bürck (3 September 1878 – 18 April 1947) was a German painter. His work was part of the painting event in the art competition at the 1936 Summer Olympics.

References

1878 births
1947 deaths
20th-century German painters
20th-century German male artists
German male painters
Olympic competitors in art competitions
Artists from Strasbourg